Salvatore Del Sole (born 27 May 1988) is an Italian footballer who played in the third and fourth tiers of football in Italy.

Biography
Born in Nola, Campania, Del Sole started his career at Parma, an Emilia club. He played at their Primavera Team in 2005–06 season. In 2006–07 season, he left for Serie C2 side Sanremese in co-ownership deal for €500, where he played 24 league matches. In June 2007, he was bought back by Parma, then loaned to Serie C1 side Manfredonia. After an unsuccessful season, he was sold to Carpenedolo of Lega Pro Seconda Divisione in another co-ownership deal for €500. In June 2009, he was bought back by Parma again and sold to Perugia Calcio in July 2009. He signed a 3-year contract. After played nil for Perugia, he was loaned to Carrarese in January 2010.

In 2010, he was signed by San Marino Calcio. In July 2013 he was signed by Rimini. The club relegated at the end of season.

References

External links
http://aic.football.it/scheda/18150/del-sole-salvatore.htm

Italian footballers
Parma Calcio 1913 players
S.S.D. Sanremese Calcio players
Manfredonia Calcio players
A.C. Perugia Calcio players
Carrarese Calcio players
A.S.D. Victor San Marino players
Rimini F.C. 1912 players
Association football midfielders
Serie C players
Sportspeople from the Province of Naples
1988 births
Living people
Footballers from Campania